Lajos Látó (born 1932) is a Hungarian cyclist. He competed in the individual and team road race events at the 1952 Summer Olympics.

References

External links
 

1932 births
Living people
Hungarian male cyclists
Olympic cyclists of Hungary
Cyclists at the 1952 Summer Olympics